Ronachai Tor.Ramintra, is a Thai Muay Thai fighter. He currently trains out of Pangkongprab-Paeminburi camp alongside Suesat Paeminburi and Kaka Paeminburi (Sok Thy).

Titles and accomplishments

Lumpinee Stadium
 2014 Lumpinee Stadium 105 lbs Champion
 2016 Lumpinee Stadium 112 lbs Champion
 2017 Lumpinee Stadium 118 lbs Champion
Awards
 2015 Lumpinee Stadium Fighter of the Year
 2022 Sports Authority of Thailand Fighter of the Year

Muay Thai record

|-  style="text-align:center; background:#fbb;"
| 2023-03-05 || Loss ||align=left| Eisaku Ogasawara || KNOCK OUT 2023 SUPER BOUT BLAZE  || Tokyo, Japan || Decision (Unanimous) ||3  ||3:00 

|-  style="background:#cfc"
| 2023-01-29 || Win ||align=left| Samingdam Chor.Ajalaboon  || TorNamThai Kiatpetch TKO, Rajadamnern Stadium || Bangkok, Thailand || Decision || 5 || 3:00

|-  style="background:#cfc;"
| 2022-11-13 || Win ||align=left| View Petchkoson || Amarin Super Fight, Rajadamnern Stadium || Bangkok, Thailand || Decision || 5||3:00
|-  style="background:#cfc"
| 2022-09-03 || Win ||align=left| Focus Adsanpatong  || TorNamThai TKO Kiatpetch, World Siam Stadium || Bangkok, Thailand || Decision || 5 || 3:00
|-  style="background:#cfc"
| 2022-06-20 || Win ||align=left| Yothin FA Group  || U-Muay RuamJaiKonRakMuayThai + Palangmai, Rajadamnern Stadium || Bangkok, Thailand || Decision || 5 || 3:00
|-  style="background:#cfc"
| 2022-05-28 || Win ||align=left| Petchrungruang SorJor.TongPrachin  || TorNamThai TKO Kiatpetch, Sor.Salacheep Stadium || Lopburi province, Thailand || Decision || 5 ||3:00 
|-  style="background:#fbb"
| 2022-04-03||Loss||align=left| Kompetch Or.Atchariya|| Channel 7 Stadium || Bangkok, Thailand || Decision ||5 ||3:00 
|- style="background:#cfc;"
|2022-01-09|| Win || align="left" | Kompetch Or.Atchariya || Chang MuayThai Kiatpetch Amarin, Rajadamnern Stadium || Thailand|| Decision|| 5 ||3:00 
|-  style="background:#fbb;"
| 2021-10-24|| Loss ||align=left| Samingdam Chor.Ajalaboon || Channel 7 Stadium || Bangkok, Thailand || Decision || 5 || 3:00 
|-  style="background:#fbb;"
| 2021-03-28|| Loss ||align=left| Prajanchai P.K.Saenchaimuaythaigym || Channel 7 Stadium || Bangkok, Thailand || Decision (Unanimous) || 5 || 3:00
|-  style="background:#cfc;"
| 2020-12-08|| Win ||align=left| Fahpennueng Por.Lakboon || Lumpinee Stadium Birthday Show|| Bangkok, Thailand || Decision || 5|| 3:00
|-  style="background:#cfc;"
| 2020-10-05|| Win||align=left| Saoek Sitchefboontham ||  R1 UFA, World Siam Stadium || Bangkok, Thailand || Decision || 5|| 3:00
|-  style="background:#cfc;"
| 2020-08-30|| Win ||align=left| Chailar Por.Lakboon || Channel 7 Stadium || Bangkok, Thailand|| Decision || 5 || 3:00
|-  style="background:#cfc;"
| 2020-07-19|| Win ||align=left| Kompetch Sitsarawatsuer || Channel 7 Stadium || Bangkok, Thailand|| Decision || 5 || 3:00
|-  style="background:#fbb;"
| 2020-02-11 || Loss ||align=left| Chailar Por.Lakboon || Lumpinee Stadium || Bangkok, Thailand || Decision || 5 || 3:00
|-  style="background:#cfc;"
| 2020-01-14 || Win ||align=left| Petch Sawansangmanja || Lumpinee Stadium || Bangkok, Thailand || Decision || 5 || 3:00
|-  style="background:#cfc;"
| 2019-12-06 || Win||align=left| Petchmuangsri Odtuekdaeng || Lumpinee Stadium || Bangkok, Thailand|| Decision || 5 || 3:00
|-  style="background:#fbb;"
| 2019-11-05 || Loss ||align=left| Petchsamarn Sor.Samarngarment || Lumpinee Stadium || Bangkok, Thailand || Decision || 5 || 3:00
|-  style="background:#cfc;"
| 2019-09-06 || Win||align=left| Kompetch Sitsarawatsuer || Lumpinee Stadium || Bangkok, Thailand|| Decision || 5 || 3:00
|-  style="background:#c5d2ea;"
| 2019-07-02 || Draw||align=left| Kompetch Sitsarawatsuer || Lumpinee Stadium || Bangkok, Thailand|| Decision || 5 || 3:00
|-  style="background:#fbb;"
| 2019-05-28 || Loss ||align=left| Petch Sawansangmanja || Lumpinee Stadium || Bangkok, Thailand || Decision || 5 || 3:00
|-  style="background:#c5d2ea;"
| 2019-04-21 || Draw ||align=left| Petch Sawansangmanja || Channel 7 Stadium || Bangkok, Thailand || Decision || 5 || 3:00
|-  style="background:#fbb;"
| 2018-12-07 || Loss ||align=left| Khunsueknoi Sitkaewprapon || Lumpinee Stadium || Bangkok, Thailand || Decision || 5 || 3:00
|-  style="background:#fbb;"
| 2018-11-09 || Loss ||align=left| Khunsueknoi Sitkaewprapon || Lumpinee Stadium || Bangkok, Thailand || Decision || 5 || 3:00
|-  style="background:#fbb;"
| 2018-03-06 || Loss ||align=left| Worawut Bowygym || Lumpinee Stadium || Bangkok, Thailand || Decision || 5 || 3:00 
|-
! style=background:white colspan=9 |
|-  style="background:#c5d2ea;"
| 2018-02-06 || Draw ||align=left| Fahmai Por.Ruangram || Lumpinee Stadium || Bangkok, Thailand || Decision || 5 || 3:00
|-  style="background:#cfc;"
| 2017-12-08|| Win ||align=left| Chalam Parunchai || Lumpinee Stadium || Bangkok, Thailand || Decision || 5 || 3:00
|-  style="background:#cfc;"
| 2017-11-14 || Win ||align=left| Chatchai PK.SaenchaiMuayThaiGym || Lumpinee Stadium || Bangkok, Thailand || Decision || 5 || 3:00
|-  style="background:#fbb;"
| 2017-09-05|| Loss||align=left| Prajanchai P.K.Saenchaimuaythaigym || Lumpinee Stadium || Bangkok, Thailand || Decision  || 5 || 3:00
|-  style="background:#fbb;"
| 2017-08-08 || Loss ||align=left| Chatchai PK.SaenchaiMuayThaiGym || Lumpinee Stadium || Bangkok, Thailand || Decision || 5 || 3:00
|-  style="background:#cfc;"
| 2017-06-09 || Win ||align=left| Kengkart Por.Pekko || Lumpinee Stadium || Bangkok, Thailand || Decision || 5 || 3:00 
|-
! style=background:white colspan=9 |
|-  style="background:#cfc;"
| 2017-04-28 || Win ||align=left| Watcharapon PK.SaenchaiMuayThaiGym || Lumpinee Stadium || Bangkok, Thailand || Decision || 5 || 3:00
|-  style="background:#fbb;"
| 2017-03-28|| Loss ||align=left| Wanchalong PK.Saenchai|| Lumpinee Stadium || Bangkok, Thailand || Decision || 5 || 3:00
|-  style="background:#fbb;"
| 2017-02-19|| Loss ||align=left| Wanchalong PK.Saenchai || Channel 7 Boxing Stadium || Bangkok, Thailand || Decision || 5 || 3:00
|-
! style=background:white colspan=9 |
|-  style="background:#cfc;"
| 2017-01-15|| Win ||align=left| Kumandoi Petcharoenvit  || Rangsit Stadium || Rangsit, Thailand ||Decision || 5 || 3:00
|-  style="background:#c5d2ea;"
| 2016-11-22 || Draw ||align=left| Watcharapon PK.SaenchaiMuayThaiGym || Lumpinee Stadium || Bangkok, Thailand || Decision || 5 || 3:00
|-  style="background:#cfc;"
| 2016-10-09|| Win ||align=left| Boonchana Nayokatasala || Channel 7 Stadium || Bangkok, Thailand || Decision || 5 || 3:00
|-  style="background:#fbb;"
| 2016-09-02|| Loss ||align=left| Kiewpayak Jitmuangnon  || Lumpinee Stadium ||Bangkok, Thailand || Decision || 5 || 3:00
|-
! style=background:white colspan=9 | 
|-  style="background:#fbb;"
| 2016-06-28 || Loss ||align=left| Watcharapon PK.SaenchaiMuayThaiGym || Lumpinee Stadium || Bangkok, Thailand || Decision || 5 || 3:00
|-  style="background:#cfc;"
| 2016-06-03 || Win ||align=left| Sarawut Sor.Jor.Vichitpadriw || Lumpinee Stadium || Bangkok, Thailand || Decision || 5 || 3:00 
|-
! style=background:white colspan=9 |
|-  style="background:#cfc;"
| 2016-05-02|| Win ||align=left| Kiewpayak Jitmuangnon  || Rajadamnern Stadium ||Bangkok, Thailand || Decision || 5 || 3:00
|-  style="background:#cfc;"
| 2016-03-29|| Win ||align=left| Kiewpayak Jitmuangnon  || Lumpinee Stadium ||Bangkok, Thailand || Decision || 5 || 3:00
|-  style="background:#fbb;"
| 2016-03-02|| Loss  ||align=left| Kiewpayak Jitmuangnon  || Rajadamnern Stadium ||Bangkok, Thailand || Decision || 5 || 3:00
|-  style="background:#fbb;"
| 2016-01-31|| Loss ||align=left| Watcharapon PK.SaenchaiMuayThaiGym || Channel 7 Stadium || Bangkok, Thailand || Decision || 5 || 3:00
|-  style="background:#cfc;"
| 2015-11-17|| Win ||align=left| Banlangngeon Por Peenapat ||  || Ubon Ratchathani, Thailand || Decision || 5 || 3:00
|-  style="background:#cfc;"
| 2015-10-09|| Win ||align=left| Rungnarai Kiatmuu9 || Lumpinee Stadium || Bangkok, Thailand || Decision || 5 || 3:00
|-  style="background:#cfc;"
| 2015-09-04 || Win ||align=left| Phetrung Nayokkaipedriew || Lumpinee Stadium || Bangkok, Thailand || Decision || 5 || 3:00
|-  style="background:#cfc;"
| 2015-07-28|| Win ||align=left| Raktemroi Visutjaroenyont || Lumpinee Stadium || Bangkok, Thailand || Decision || 5 || 3:00
|-  style="background:#cfc;"
| 2015-06-29 || Win ||align=left| Sam-D PetchyindeeAcademy ||  || Udon Thani, Thailand || Decision || 5 || 3:00
|-  style="background:#c5d2ea;"
| 2015-05-01 || Draw ||align=left| Ongree Sor.Dechaphan ||  || Koh Samui, Thailand || Decision || 5 || 3:00
|-  style="background:#cfc;"
| 2015-04-03 || Win ||align=left| Phetrung Nayokkaipedriew || Lumpinee Stadium || Bangkok, Thailand || Decision || 5 || 3:00
|-  style="background:#cfc;"
| 2015-03-03 || Win ||align=left| Banlangngeon Por Peenapat || Lumpinee Stadium || Bangkok, Thailand || Decision || 5 || 3:00
|-  style="background:#cfc;"
| 2015-01-15 || Win ||align=left| Ongree Sor.Dechaphan || Rajadamnern Stadium || Bangkok, Thailand || Decision || 5 || 3:00
|-  style="background:#cfc;"
| 2014-12-06 || Win ||align=left| Senpayak Phor.Jaroenpeth || Lumpinee Stadium || Bangkok, Thailand || Decision || 5 || 3:00 
|-
! style=background:white colspan=9 |
|-  style="background:#cfc;"
| 2014-10-31 || Win ||align=left| Phetmuangnon Jitmuangnon || Lumpinee Stadium || Bangkok, Thailand || Decision || 5 || 3:00
|-  style="background:#cfc;"
| 2014-09-30 || Win ||align=left| Rit Jitmuangnon || Lumpinee Stadium || Bangkok, Thailand || Decision || 5 || 3:00
|-  style="background:#cfc;"
| 2014-09-09 || Win ||align=left| Anuwat Numjeantawanna || Lumpinee Stadium || Bangkok, Thailand || Decision || 5 || 3:00
|-  style="background:#fbb;"
| 2014-07-04 || Loss ||align=left| Banlangngeon Por Peenapat || Lumpinee Stadium || Bangkok, Thailand || Decision || 5 || 3:00
|-  style="background:#cfc;"
| 2014-01-10 || Win ||align=left| Petchjetse Sor Tienpo || Lumpinee Stadium || Bangkok, Thailand || Decision || 5 || 3:00
|-  style="background:#cfc;"
| 2013-12-06 || Win ||align=left| Ne-ngeon Lukjaomaesaiwaree || Lumpinee Stadium || Bangkok, Thailand || Decision || 5 || 3:00
|-
| colspan=9 | Legend:

See also
List of male kickboxers

References

Living people
Ronachai Tor.Ramintra
1997 births
Ronachai Tor.Ramintra